Cecilia Loffredo (born , Copenhagen, Denmark) is a Danish actress.

Career
Cecilia debuted in the film Valhala as Røskva and rose to fame as Luna on Netflix TV series The Rain.

Filmography

References
2.https://www.lindbergmanagement.com/actor/cecilia-loffredo/

External links

2008 births
Living people
Danish television actresses
Danish child actresses
Danish film actresses